Toshe may refer to:

 Toshe (dish), a Sindhi Indian dish made from flour, ghee and milk 
 Toeshey, traditional Tibetan dance music genre